Briestfield is a village in the unparished area of Dewsbury, in the Kirklees district, in the county of West Yorkshire, England.

See also
Listed buildings in Dewsbury

External links

Villages in West Yorkshire
Geography of Dewsbury